The Uninhibited is a 1965 Spanish film directed by Juan Antonio Bardem, and starring Melina Mercouri, James Mason, and Hardy Kruger. It was entered into the 1965 Cannes Film Festival.

Plot
A young man from Paris moves to a small Spanish village, to stay at a friend's house. He soon becomes involved in a love triangle with his friend and a local woman.

Cast
 Melina Mercouri - Jenny
 Hardy Krüger - Vincent
 James Mason - Pascal Regnier
 Didier Haudepin - Daniel Regnier
 Renaud Verley - Serge
 Sophie Darès - Nadine (as Martine Ziguel)
 Keiko Kishi - Nora
 Maurice Teynac - Reginald
 Karin Mossberg - Orange the Mistress
 José María Mompín - Tom
 Luis Induni - Bryant

References

External links
 

1965 films
French drama films
Italian drama films
1960s Spanish-language films
English-language French films
English-language Italian films
English-language Spanish films
1960s English-language films
1965 drama films
Films scored by Georges Delerue
Films directed by Juan Antonio Bardem
Spanish drama films
1960s Spanish films
1960s Italian films
1960s French films